Kameelputs is a town in Greater Taung Local Municipality in the North West province of South Africa.

References

Populated places in the Greater Taung Local Municipality